Abdul Salam Kanaan (19 May 1931 – 8 February 2014) was a Jordanian politician. He held several ministerial posts during the 1980s. Kanaan was Minister of Social development in 1984 and from 1988 to 1989 he served as Supply Minister and Minister of State for Prime ministry affairs.

References

1931 births
2014 deaths
Government ministers of Jordan
State ministers of Jordan
Prime ministry affairs ministers of Jordan